John Robertson Boyd (born 1 January 1969) is a retired Scottish footballer who played for Dumbarton and St Mirren.

References

1969 births
Scottish footballers
Dumbarton F.C. players
St Mirren F.C. players
Scottish Football League players
Living people
Association football fullbacks